Physical Jerks is a 1997 Italian comedy film directed by Stefano Reali. It is an adaptation of a semi-autobiographical comedy play by the same Reali.

The English version of its title is the (chiefly British) informal term for physical exercise.

Cast 

 Valerio Mastandrea: Massimo Migliarini
 Antonio Catania: Luigi "Gigi" Bonsanti
 Maurizio Mattioli: Carlo 
 Emanuela Rossi: Wanda
 Pierfrancesco Favino: Castrovillari
 Davide Bechini: Giorgio Cupreo
 Enrico Brignano: Zinna
 Raffaele Vannoli: Brianza

References

External links

1997 films
1997 comedy films
Italian comedy films
Films set in Rome
Films set in hospitals
Italian films based on plays
1990s Italian films